Schloss Esterházy is a palace in Eisenstadt, Austria.

Schloss Esterházy may also refer to:
 Schloss Esterházy in Fertőd, Hungary (also known as Eszterháza)
 Schloss Esterhazy in Galanta, Slovakia

See also 
 Palais Esterházy

Esterházy family